Eklak Ahmid (born 12 October 1984) is an Indian former cricketer. He played two first-class matches for Bengal between 2005 and 2006.

See also
 List of Bengal cricketers

References

External links
 

1984 births
Living people
Indian cricketers
Bengal cricketers
Cricketers from Kolkata